Jonny Hansen (born 12 January 1981) is a Norwegian former footballer who last played as a midfielder for IF Fram Larvik.

He was born in Kristiansund, and started his career in Kristiansund FK, later joining Molde FK. Ahead of the 2003 season he joined Aalesunds FK, where he got seven Norwegian top division games in the 2003 season. Ahead of the 2005 season he joined Skeid Fotball, leaving that club after the 2006 season. In 2008, he joined Strømmen IF. After three seasons he went on to Fram Larvik, where he ended his playing career after one season.

References

1981 births
Living people
Sportspeople from Kristiansund
Norwegian footballers
Association football midfielders
Molde FK players
Aalesunds FK players
Skeid Fotball players
Strømmen IF players
Eliteserien players